Carol Comeau (née Smith; born 1941) is an American educator. She was inaugurated to the Alaska Women's Hall of Fame in 2009.

Personal life and education
Carol Comeau was born in Berkeley, California and raised in Iowa. Her father died when she was seven. When she was young, she wanted to be an investigative reporter. She attended the University of Oregon to earn her bachelor's degree in journalism, however, she started studying elementary education her sophomore year. In 1960, she met Denny Comeau. She and Denny would marry in 1962. His father owned a grocery store in Anchorage, Alaska. In 1963, Comeau and Denny spent the summer in Anchorage working for Denny's father, before they returned to Oregon so Denny could finish his degree. Comeau worked in Springfield, Oregon. In 1965, they moved to Alaska.

In 1972, the couple moved back to Spokane, Washington. Denny worked for Chevron. They returned to Alaska in 1974. Together, Comeau and Denny had three children, Christopher, Michael, and Karen. Comeau returned to work full-time after ten years. Comeau earned her Master's degree in public administration and education from the University of Alaska Anchorage. She and Denny have five grandchildren together, Adam, Amanda, Samantha, Reid, and Elizabeth.

Work
Comeau started teaching again in 1975. She helped lead a strike, which lasted seven days, in 1979. In 1984, she became president of the Anchorage Education Association. In 1993, she became a superintendent for the Anchorage School District. She became head superintendent for the school district in 2000. She helped get Islamic and Jewish holidays added to the school calendar and included sexual orientation as part of the anti-harassment policy for the Anchorage School District. As of 2011, Comeau was one of the lowest paid city school superintendents in the United States. She retired on June 30, 2012.

Legacy
Comeau was named Alaska Superintendent of the Year in 2004. In 2007, she was awarded an honorary doctorate at the University of Alaska Anchorage. In 2012, she was named an alumnus of Distinction and given the Alumni of Achievement Award by the University of Alaska Anchorage. An endowment at the Alaska Community Foundation is named after Comeau, which is focused on education.

References

External links
 "Carol Comeau says goodbye to district" from the Anchorage Daily News

1941 births
20th-century American women
21st-century American women
American women educators
Anchorage School District
Living people
People from Anchorage, Alaska
People from Berkeley, California
School superintendents in Alaska
Schoolteachers from Alaska
University of Alaska Anchorage alumni
University of Oregon alumni